Giovanni Codrington (born 17 July 1988) is a Dutch athlete, who competes in the sprint with a personal best time of 10.29 seconds at the 100 m and 21.42 seconds at the 200 m event.

Codrington won the gold medal at the 2012 European Athletics Championships in Helsinki at the 4 × 100 m relay.

External links 
 

1988 births
Living people
Sportspeople from Paramaribo
Dutch male sprinters
Olympic athletes of the Netherlands
Surinamese emigrants to the Netherlands
Athletes (track and field) at the 2012 Summer Olympics
Athletes (track and field) at the 2016 Summer Olympics
European Athletics Championships medalists
World Athletics Championships athletes for the Netherlands